Evgenija Ovod (born 10 November 1982) is a Russian chess player, an International Master and a Woman Grandmaster.

She competed in the Women's World Chess Championship 2012, 2010 and 2006.

External links 

chess games entry

Living people
Chess woman grandmasters
Chess International Masters
1982 births
Place of birth missing (living people)
Russian female chess players